Stizocera daudini is a species of beetle in the family Cerambycidae. It was described by Chalumeau and Touroult in 2005.

References

Stizocera
Beetles described in 2005